"You Take Me for Granted" is a song written by Leona Williams, and recorded by American country music artist Merle Haggard backed by The Strangers.  It was released in March 1983 as the second single from the album Going Where the Lonely Go.  The song was Haggard's twenty-ninth number one on the country chart.  The single stayed at number one for one week and spent a total of thirteen weeks on the country chart.

Cover versions
 The song was covered by The Forester Sisters on their 1991 album Talkin' 'Bout Men.

Charts

Weekly charts

Year-end charts

References

1983 singles
Merle Haggard songs
The Forester Sisters songs
Epic Records singles
1982 songs
Songs written by Leona Williams